Rameshwar Dadich won the election for Mayor of Jodhpur on Congress party's ticket defeating the nearest rival by 34,472 votes in the November 2009 municipal election of Rajasthan.

References

People from Jodhpur
Living people
Rajasthani politicians
Year of birth missing (living people)